Ocna Mureș is a town in Alba County, Romania, located in the north-eastern corner of the county, near the Mureș River. The town is situated next to a large deposit of salt, mined in the past until the ceiling of the mines collapsed from water infiltration in 1978. Ocna Mureș has a chlorosodic products plant, a salt extraction plant and a spa which uses the salty water from the former mines.

The town administers five villages: Cisteiu de Mureș (Magyarcsesztve), Micoșlaca (Miklóslaka), Războieni-Cetate (Székelyföldvár), Uioara de Jos (until 1960 Ciunga; Csongva) and Uioara de Sus (Felsőmarosújvár). Its former name is Uioara, and was called Ocna Mureșului from 1925 to 1956.

The spa is no longer running. The chemical plant in town was lastly purchased by an Indian company from a company based in Timișoara. Currently, the plant has ceased activity. The majority of high school students attend either Liceul Teoretic Petru Maior or the 'Chemistry School,' where many are trained to later work for the factory in town. Exceptional students progress onto university studies, generally in nearby Cluj-Napoca or Alba Iulia, the county capital. The downtown was relocated after the mine was flooded as the ground became unstable. Now this area is filled with more than 4 large, very deep lakes. The center of town is now at the base of a large hill, the 'Banța.'

Climate
Ocna Mureș has a humid continental climate (Cfb in the Köppen climate classification).

Demographics 

According to the census from 2011 there was a total population of 13,036 people living in this town. Of this population, 83.46% are ethnic Romanians, 9.31% are ethnic Hungarians, and 7% ethnic Romani.

Natives 

 Ovidiu Maier - professional footballer
 Rareș Bogdan - journalist and politician

See also
 Castra of Războieni-Cetate

References

Towns in Romania
Populated places in Alba County
Localities in Transylvania
Mining communities in Romania
Monotowns in Romania